Rosa caesia is a species of flowering plant belonging to the family Rosaceae.

It is native to Europe and the Caucasus.

References

caesia